The Great American Songbook Foundation is a 501(c)(3) nonprofit organization dedicated to the preservation and promotion of the music of the Great American Songbook. The Songbook Foundation's administrative offices are located on the Gallery level of The Palladium at the Center for Performing Arts, a 1,600-seat concert hall in Carmel, Indiana that opened in January 2011. Previously known as the Michael Feinstein Foundation for the Education and Preservation of the Great American Songbook and as the Michael Feinstein Great American Songbook Initiative, the organization took on its current name in 2014.

History and operation 

Michael Feinstein founded the organization in 2007. Upon Feinstein's appointment as artistic director of the Center for the Performing Arts in 2009, the organization made a commitment to place its headquarters and archives on the center's campus in Carmel, Indiana.

The Great American Songbook Foundation's administrative headquarters houses a reference library, study and listening rooms for researchers, archival storage space, and the Songbook Exhibit Gallery, an exhibit space featuring rotating interactive presentations about the music, its creators and the performers of the Great American Songbook.

Education and outreach

Songbook Exhibit Gallery 

The Songbook Exhibit Gallery features rotating exhibits. These exhibits helps guests to place the music of this era in context with the events that occurred in the 20th-century United States. The Songbook Foundation offers corresponding educational programs and guided tours for school groups, civic and professional organizations, and members of the general public.

Since 2011, the Songbook Foundation has presented the following exhibits: "The Great American Songbook" (2011), "G.I. Jive: The Music and Entertainers of World War II" (2012), "Blast from the Past: Roaring Hot '20s Jazz" (2013), "A Change Is Gonna Come: 1960s Broadway Musicals" (2014), "Gus Kahn: The Man Behind the Music" (2015), and "The Great Indiana Songbook: Two Centuries of Hoosier Music" (2016).  The exhibit now on display is "Ella Sings the Songbook", celebrating Ella Fitzgerald's 100th birthday and commemorating her more than fifty-year career, much of which was spent performing music from the Great American Songbook.  In particular, the exhibit highlights the series of eight albums of Songbook music sung by Ella under the direction of Norman Granz and issued by Verve Records. These exhibits focus on different time periods, styles, and artists. In addition to the interactive display which houses clips and short biographies of over four decades of singers and songwriters,  artifacts from the Songbook Archives that relate to the music and musicians being highlighted in the Songbook Gallery exhibits are displayed.

Songbook Academy® Summer Intensive 

The Songbook Academy Summer Intensive, formerly known as the High School Vocal Academy and Competition, originated in 2009 and is held annually in July. The program is "the only vocal competition based solely on music from Broadway, Hollywood musicals and the Tin Pan Alley era."

Recent Songbook Academy finalists have performed in major venues in Las Vegas, Pasadena, New York City, Costa Mesa, Washington, D.C., and San Francisco. In June 2016, Maddie Baillio was cast as Tracy Turnblad in NBC's production of Hairspray Live!.

Great American Songbook Youth Ambassadors:
 2009: Julia Bonnett
 2010: Annie Yokom
 2011: event on hiatus
 2012: Nick Ziobro
 2013: Julia Goodwin
 2014: Madelyn Baillio
 2015: Lucas DeBard
 2016: Brighton Thomas
 2017: Finn Sagal

Songbook Hall of Fame 

The Great American Songbook Hall of Fame is a tribute to people who have contributed to the genre, memorializing composers, performers, and lyricists who have added to the history of the Songbook. Artists are nominated and selected based on the following criteria:
 Artists who made a significant contribution to the Golden Age of American popular music, typically defined as the period from the early years of the Twentieth century through the 1960s;
 Living songwriters, both lyricists and composers, who have made a significant impact on American pop culture by creating the most beloved songs from the American popular songbook; and
 Artists, songwriters and/or performers who continues to create the soundtrack of our lives by writing and/or performing music that will become the pop standards of tomorrow."

Each year, the Center for the Performing Arts hosts the Songbook Celebration Gala, a black-tie event that celebrates the lives and careers of the artists who have been selected for induction into the Great American Songbook Hall of Fame. Nominees (or their representatives, in the case of posthumous award winners) are invited to Carmel where they are honored with tribute performances celebrating their achievements. Tribute performers at past Songbook Celebration Gala events include Jimmy Smits, Andrea McArdle, Jessica Sanchez, Laura Osnes, Karen Ziemba, Chris Mann, and Kristin Chenoweth.

Great American Songbook Hall of Fame Inductees include Alan & Marilyn Bergman, Barry Manilow, and Cole Porter (2012); Liza Minnelli, Rita Moreno, Frank Sinatra, and Jimmy Webb (2013); Nat King Cole, Shirley Jones, Johnny Mathis, and Linda Ronstadt (2014); George & Ira Gershwin, Chita Rivera, and Steve Lawrence & Eydie Gormé (2015); and Hoagy Carmichael, Diahann Carroll, and Dionne Warwick (2016). The 2017 class, consisting of Ella Fitzgerald, Mitzi Gaynor, and Ray Gilbert, was inducted into the Songbook Hall of Fame on Saturday, September 30 at the annual Songbook Celebration Gala and Hall of Fame Induction Ceremony.

GRAMMY Museum Cultural Affiliation 
In July 2017, the Los Angeles-based GRAMMY Museum announced that the Great American Songbook Foundation has been designated as a Cultural Affiliate, joining four other institutions worldwide: the Bob Marley Museum in Kingston, Jamaica; the Woody Guthrie Center in Tulsa, OH; The Beatles Story in Liverpool, UK; and the National Blues Museum in St. Louis, MO. The relationship will allow collaboration between the organizations on exhibits and educational and research programs, among other amenities.

Perfect Harmony Music Program 
Founded in 2015, the Foundation's Perfect Harmony program offers music experiences to people with Alzheimer's, dementia and other neurodegenerative diseases. This new program was launched in collaboration with the Greater Indiana Chapter of the Alzheimer's Association. During the science-based Perfect Harmony program, participants and caregivers are involved in social singing with Songbook music. As a group, people share experiences related to memorable songs and the monthly theme.

Songbook Film Series 
The Great American Songbook Foundation partnered with Indianapolis-based Heartland Film and the Center for the Performing Arts to present classic movie musicals to the public, cultivating a new generation of movie lovers. Some screenings included guest speakers, who enlightened audiences on the nature and creation of the movies shown.

Archives, library, and preservation 

The Songbook Archives serves as a repository for the papers of significant Songbook figures including Meredith Willson, Hy Zaret, and Gus Kahn, as well as special collections covering such artists as The Andrews Sisters in the following formats: sheet music, photos, scrapbooks, posters, LPs, 45s, music magazines, books, lacquer discs, personal papers, theatre playbills, film, video, analog tape, and recordings. Many of these items are currently approaching one hundred years of age. A finite window of time exists to preserve these materials through digitization.

The Foundation's non-circulating library houses a wide variety of reference materials. In addition, students, teachers and researchers from around the world visit the Foundation's website to view and research selections from the Archives, which contains over one hundred collections, 35,000 pieces of sheet music, and 3,000 reference books.

Items housed in the Foundation's Archives include:

 7,000 audio recordings in thirteen different formats, including Rudy Vallée's radio transcription discs dating from 1932;
 Meredith Willson's personal papers, scripts, and recordings, including The Music Man and The Unsinkable Molly Brown;
 Musical orchestrations from Bob and Dolores Hope's decades of live performances across the globe;
 The piano which was used by composer Richard A. Whiting to write "Hooray for Hollywood"; and
 Hy Zaret's original lyrics for "Unchained Melody", one of the twentieth century's most frequently recorded songs.

See also
 List of music museums

References 

Music archives in the United States
Music halls of fame
Music history
Music museums in the United States
Music organizations based in the United States
2007 establishments in Indiana